"Splashin" is a song by American rapper Rich the Kid. It was released on December 3, 2018, as the lead single from his second studio album The World Is Yours 2. The song peaked at number 80 on the Billboard Hot 100.

Critical reception 
The song received generally positive reviews. Aron A. of HotNewHipHop called the track's instrumental "lurky" and "bass-heavy". Trent Fitzgerald of XXL said that the track "should have the clubs bumping throughout the holiday season". Torsten Ingvaldsen of Hypebeast called the track "menacing".

Music video 
The music video for the track was released on January 8, 2019. Rich the Kid himself stated that the video was inspired by Missy Elliott in an interview with Billboard.

Charts

Certifications

References 

2018 singles
2018 songs
Rich the Kid songs
Songs written by Rich the Kid
Interscope Records singles